The Highway Fire was a fire during the 2015 California Wildfire season. The fire started on April 18, 2015 by an unattended cooking fire. The fire burned 1,049 acres in Riverside County. There were 16 agencies involved, including Cal Fire. There were 54 personnel, 3 crews, and 4 engines assigned to the fire. The fire was contained on April 24, 2015.

References 

2015 California wildfires